The Bay of Cádiz is a comarca (county, but with no administrative role) in the province of Cádiz, Andalusia, southern Spain.  

The present-day comarca was established in 2003 by the Government of Andalusia.

Municipalities
The Bahia de Cádiz comarca includes five municipalities:

References

External links

Consorcio de Transportes Bahía de Cádiz
Official website

 
Comarcas of the Province of Cádiz